Aigars Kriķis (August 28, 1954 in Riga – April 15, 1999). was a Latvian Soviet luger who competed during the late 1970s. He won the gold medal at the men's doubles (together with Dainis Bremze) event at the 1978 FIL World Luge Championships in Imst, Austria.

Kriķis also won a bronze medal in the men's doubles event at the 1976 FIL European Luge Championships in Hammarstrand, Sweden.

Kriķis also finished eighth in the men's doubles event at the 1976 Winter Olympics in Innsbruck.

Born in Riga, Latvia. He started his career at the age of 14. 
Kriķis was a triple USSR Champion in Men's Doubles from 1973 to 1975.
With writing at the time (usage of typewriters) his name Aigars was sometimes misspelled as Algars.

References

External links
Hickok sports information on World champions in luge and skeleton.
List of European luge champions 
Wallenchinsky, David. (1984). "Luge: Men's Two-seater". In The Complete Book the Olympics: 1896-1980. New York: Penguin Books. p. 576.

1954 births
1999 deaths
Lugers at the 1976 Winter Olympics
Lugers at the 1980 Winter Olympics
Latvian male lugers
Soviet male lugers
Olympic lugers of the Soviet Union
Sportspeople from Riga